Poromniusa is a genus of beetles belonging to the family Staphylinidae.

The species of this genus are found in Europe.

Species:
 Poromniusa crassa (Eppelsheim, 1883) 
 Poromniusa procidua (Erichson, 1837)

References

Staphylinidae
Staphylinidae genera